Orthocomotis volochilesia is a species of moth of the family Tortricidae. It is found in Carchi Province, Ecuador.

The wingspan is 26 mm. The ground colour of the forewings is whitish, in the dorsal and median parts suffused with greyish and scaled with brown and orange. The markings and costal spots are dark brown. The hindwings are pale brown grey with brownish cream dots.

Etymology
The species name refers to the Volcan Chiles Massive.

References

Moths described in 2007
Orthocomotis